PIFF may refer to:

 Busan International Film Festival, previously Pusan International Film Festival, South Korea
Pyongyang International Film Festival,North Korea
 Pearl International Film Festival, Kampala, Uganda
 Pondicherry International Film Festival, Union Territory of Puducherry, India
 Prague Independent Film Festival, Czech Republic
 Pride International Film Festival, Manila, Philippines
 Provincetown International Film Festival, Provincetown, Massachusetts
 Pune International Film Festival, Maharashtra, India
 Patna Film Festival, formerly Patna International Film Festival, Bihar, India